Sam (November 7, 1990 – November 18, 2005) was a blind pure-bred Chinese Crested dog, and three-time champion of the annual Sonoma-Marin Fair World's Ugliest Dog Contest in Northern California in 2003–2005. His ugliness earned him international fame and celebrity. His death made international headlines.

His owner, Santa Barbara resident Susie Lockheed, took him in as a rescue dog in 1999 from his first owner.

Media
In 2005 Sam starred on Criss Angel's 2005 Mindfreak Halloween Special which aired on the A&E Network. Sam played the role of Angel's cat, dressed up in a Halloween costume.
Sam was featured on Japanese television, New Zealand radio and the Daily Telegraph in England.

Death
Due to heart complications, Sam was euthanized on November 18, 2005, just 11 days after his 15th birthday.

See also
 List of individual dogs
 Elwood (dog)

References

External links 
 Official site - Sam & Susie's Blog
 www.uglyanimals.org - A collection of "ugly" animals

1990 animal births
2005 animal deaths
Individual dogs